The New York Mutuals baseball team finished second in the  National Association in 1874.

Regular season

Season standings

Record vs. opponents

Roster

Player stats

Batting
Note: G = Games played; AB = At bats; H = Hits; Avg. = Batting average; HR = Home runs; RBI = Runs batted in

Starting pitchers 
Note: G = Games pitched; IP = Innings pitched; W = Wins; L = Losses; ERA = Earned run average; SO = Strikeouts

Relief pitchers 
''Note: G = Games pitched; W = Wins; L = Losses; SV = Saves; ERA = Earned run average; SO = Strikeouts

References

External links 
 1874 New York Mutuals at Baseball Reference

New York Mutuals seasons
New York Mutuals season
New York Mut
19th century in Brooklyn
Williamsburg, Brooklyn